Radio Złote Przeboje, (lit. Golden Hits Radio) also called Złote Przeboje  is a Polish radio station. The radio operator (since 26 November 2012) is Jarosław Barwiak. The music director since August 2018 is Joanna Sołtysiak. Its target audience is 25 to 50 year olds. The name "Złote Przeboje" translates to "Golden Hits", which the radio called music from the 60s, 70s and 80s.

History 
The radio was founded in 1997 by Agora as one of its products. In 2004, Agora decided to make its products more close to their brand, merging many of them, including its own radio stations, e.g. Radio Pogoda became Radio Złote Przeboje Pogoda. In 2007, local radio presenters were fired and replaced by local offices which now broadcast the countrywide Radio Złote Przeboje.

From 2007 to 2010, Marek Niedźwiecki was associated with the radio and led a few podcasts, most importantly his record chart called "Lista przebojów Marka Niedźwieckiego". Many other famous people were associated with the radio, such as Robert Janowski, Jarosław Boberek, Marcin Prokop and Michał Koterski.

It is worth noting that over time, the radio's broadcast schedule changed. In its first years, it mainly broadcast music from the 60s, 70s, and 80s, though it progressively changed to 70s, 80s, 90s and 2000s.

Frequencies

See also 
Agora (company)
Radio ZET
Radio in Poland
List of Polish-language radio stations

Notes

References 

Radio stations in Poland
1997 establishments in Poland
Radio stations established in 1997
Mass media in Poland